Kiss Loves You is a 2004 documentary film directed by Jim Heneghan and co-produced by 8th Grade Films and Sveriges Television. The documentary chronicles the triumphs, tragedies and absurdities of a select group of Kiss fans over a 10-year period beginning in 1994, during which the band reunited in original greasepaint and costumes.

Kiss Loves You is named after an affirmation the band has used to conclude most of their live concerts since 1974.

References

External links 
  at 8th Grade Films
 
 
  SVT Synopsis at SVT Dokumentär
  KISS Background Info at Sveriges Television

2004 films
2004 documentary films
Rockumentaries
American documentary films
Kiss (band) video albums
2000s English-language films
2000s American films